Thomas T. Wright House, also known as the Old Hildreth Home, is a historic house located in Craig Township, Switzerland County, Indiana. The house is situated on a hill overlooking the Ohio River. It was built in 1838, and is a two-story, five bay, Greek Revival style brick dwelling with later additions.  It features a two-tier front portico supported by Doric order columns.

It was listed on the National Register of Historic Places in 1980.

References

Houses on the National Register of Historic Places in Indiana
Greek Revival houses in Indiana
Houses completed in 1838
Buildings and structures in Switzerland County, Indiana
National Register of Historic Places in Switzerland County, Indiana